Animal is an album by the American R&B band the Bar-Kays, released in 1989. 

The album peaked at No. 36 on the Billboard Top Black Albums chart. Its first single was "Struck By You", which peaked at No. 11 on the Hot Black Singles chart.

Production
The band recorded the album as a trio. Joe Walsh played guitar on the title track. "Just Like a Teeter Totter" was cowritten and coproduced by Sly Stone.

Critical reception

The Orlando Sentinel concluded that "although modern, metallic sounds shape the bouncing, bending rhythm of the title song, for instance, there's a touch of old- fashioned call-and-response interplay in the vocals." USA Today opined that "what's nice about this album, though, is the band's mature, unfunky handling of slow tunes ... 'Leaving You' shows they can be true balladeers." The New York Amsterdam News determined that although Animal "is thigh-high in funk-fortified R&B, the music is never dated."

AllMusic wrote that "it's important to remember that the Bar-Kays never stopped being a good band—it was taste and fashion that twisted the knife and pushed them aside." The Rolling Stone Album Guide thought that "their best cuts resemble lite pastiches of other bands' refinements."

Track listing

References

Bar-Kays albums
1989 albums
Mercury Records albums